Shah Viran may refer to:
Shah Viran-e Bala
Shah Viran-e Pain